The 1936 United States Senate election in Arkansas took place on November 3, 1936. Incumbent Democratic Senator and Senate Majority Leader Joseph T. Robinson was re-elected to a fifth term in office. He defeated two Democratic opponents in the primary election and then dispatched Republican G.C. Ledbetter in the general election.

Democratic primary

Candidates
Cleveland Holland
Joseph Taylor Robinson, incumbent Senator since 1913 and Senate Majority Leader since 1933
J. Rosser Venable

Results

General election

Results

See also
1936 United States Senate elections

References 

1936
Arkansas
United States Senate